E. Q. Q. Sanniez was a Ghanaian civil servant, politician, and member of the National Liberation Council. He was the Assistant Commissioner of the Ghana Police Service, and the Volta Regional Minister  from 1966 to 1967. He was succeeded by Lt. Col. E. N. Dedjoe, a former Quartermaster of Emmanuel Kwasi Kotoka.

References 
 

20th-century births 
Year of birth missing
Possibly living people
Ghanaian civil servants
Ghanaian police officers